Glenda Cecilia Miranda-Alvarado (born December 6, 1985 in Babahoyo, Los Ríos) is a judoka from Ecuador.

Bio
Miranda was born in Babahoyo and begun doing judo at the age of 7. She lives and trains in the largest city of Ecuador in Guayaquil.

Her favorite food is fish.

She is very good friend with another Ecuadorian judoka and Olympian Carmen Chalá who is also her sport idol.

Judo
Miranda used to compete for many years in extra half-lightweight category where she gained participation at 2008 Olympic Games in Beijing for very good results from continental championships. In Beijing she fought two matches and lost both of them but it had to be great experience for her.

After Olympic games she moved to half-lightweight category where is still waiting for a good result and some winning lead.

Achievements

References

External links
 
 
 

1985 births
Living people
People from Babahoyo
Ecuadorian female judoka
Olympic judoka of Ecuador
Judoka at the 2008 Summer Olympics
Competitors at the 2010 South American Games
21st-century Ecuadorian women